The LX platform is Chrysler's full-size rear wheel drive automobile platform introduced in 2004 for the 2005 model year. The LX was developed in North America to supersede the previous Chrysler LH platform, which had been designed to allow it to be easily upgraded to rear and all-wheel drive. The LD Charger, 300 and LA Challenger cars are built at Brampton Assembly in Brampton, Ontario, Canada. The European variant and all RHD models were built in Graz, Austria by Magna Steyr from June 2005 until 2010, where they carried the platform designation of LE.

LX
Vehicles using the LX platform include:
 2005–2010 Chrysler 300 sedan, station wagon (LE Only)
 2005–2008 Dodge Magnum station wagon
 2006–2010 Dodge Charger sedan

Concept vehicles using this platform include:
 Chrysler Nassau sedan
 Chrysler Airflite sedan

LC
The LC platform is a shortened LX platform designed for the Challenger.

Vehicles using the LC/LA platform include:

 2008–2014, LC
 2015–Present, LA
Dodge Challenger coupe

Concept vehicles using this platform include:
 Chrysler 200C EV sedan

LD 
The LD platform was introduced in 2011 for the second generation of the Charger. It is an entirely redesigned and updated platform but is closely related to the original LX.

Vehicles using the LD platform include:

 2011–present Dodge Charger
 2011–2023 Chrysler 300
 2012–2015 Lancia Thema sedan

LA
The LA platform code has been used for the updated Dodge Challenger beginning in the 2015 model year. It was created primarily to allow the Challenger to use an eight speed automatic transmission.
 2015– Dodge Challenger coupe

LY
The LY platform is a lengthened LX platform used for:
 2006 Chrysler Imperial sedan concept car

Future LD Platform

In June 2018, former FCA CEO, Sergio Marchionne stated that Dodge Challenger and Charger will retain the current LD platform which will be heavily revised for the next generation. Many thoughts suggesting the current LD Platform cars would hit the Giorgio platform, however this was later debunked by Marchionne stating that the Giorgio is more suited towards sports oriented European vehicles instead of American muscle cars.

References

LX